Danila Andreyevich Sukhomlinov (born 31 August 2002) is a Russian football player who plays as an attacking midfielder for FC Rostov.

Club career
He made his debut in the Russian Premier League for FC Rostov on 8 November 2020 in a game against PFC CSKA Moscow.

On 18 June 2022, Sukhomlinov was loaned to FC SKA-Khabarovsk for the 2022–23 season.

Career statistics

References

External links
 
 

2002 births
Footballers from Voronezh
Living people
Russian footballers
Association football midfielders
FC Rostov players
FC SKA-Khabarovsk players
Russian Premier League players
Russian First League players